María Cristina Verde Rodarte is a Mexican process engineer and control theorist whose research concerns the robust control of hydraulic systems: modeling industrial processes that involve liquid flow through pipes, monitoring those processes, and detecting and isolating leaks. She is a researcher and professor at the National Autonomous University of Mexico (UNAM), in the faculty of engineering.

Education and career
Verde was born in Mexico City, on 15 February 1950. She studied electronic and communications engineering at the Instituto Politécnico Nacional, graduating in 1973, and earning a master's degree through CINVESTAV in 1974. She worked as a professor and researcher at CINVESTAV from 1971 to 1978.

In 1979 she began graduate study in electrical engineering at the University of Duisburg in Germany. She completed her PhD in 1984 and returned to Mexico as a researcher in the UNAM Engineering Institute. She became a professor there in 1986.

Recognition
Verde is a member of the Mexican Academy of Sciences. UNAM gave her their Sor Juana Inés de la Cruz Recognition in 2005.

References

External links

1950 births
Living people
Engineers from Mexico City
Mexican engineers
Mexican women engineers
Control theorists
Instituto Politécnico Nacional alumni
University of Duisburg-Essen alumni
Academic staff of the National Autonomous University of Mexico
Members of the Mexican Academy of Sciences
20th-century Mexican women scientists
21st-century Mexican women scientists